Netcare Limited is a South African private healthcare company. It operates through a number of subsidiaries and employs just over 21 000 people. 

The group offers a range of medical services across the healthcare spectrum and operates South Africa’s largest network of private acute care hospitals as well as emergency medical services, primary healthcare, renal dialysis and mental health services.

Netcare provides the following private healthcare facilities and services:

Acute care private hospital services available at 51 owned and managed Netcare hospitals, including two public private partnership (PPP) hospitals, with a total of over 10 000 beds. Three of its hospitals have been accredited as Level 1 trauma centres by the Trauma Society of South Africa (TSSA) and are the only Level 1 trauma centres in the private healthcare sector in South Africa
 Radiosurgery, radiotherapy, chemotherapy, through Netcare Cancer Care at nine dedicated centres; as well as haematology and bone marrow transplants at five centres; paediatric oncology at three facilities, and robotic assisted surgery for cancer at three hospitals
Primary healthcare services provided through Netcare Medicross at 77 medical and dental centres countrywide
Day surgery performed at 15 day hospitals located either within Netcare Medicross.centres or functioning as free-standing facilities
Pre-hospital emergency medical services provided through Netcare 911 by emergency care practitioners. Netcare 911’s fleet of emergency vehicles includes road ambulances as well as helicopter and fixed-wing air ambulances, dedicated mobile intensive care units and rescue vehicles
Occupational health and employee wellness services provided through Netcare Occupational Health, contracting with employers ranging from multi-national corporates to smaller enterprises, across all industry sectors
Mental health and psychiatric services provided through Netcare Akeso at 12 dedicated facilities
Affordable private healthcare products offered through NetcarePlus and aimed primarily at individuals and families without medical cover
Chronic renal dialysis services offered through National Renal Care (NRC) at 79 dedicated renal dialysis units countrywide

Netcare is also a private trainer of nursing and emergency medical personnel through Netcare Education’s Faculty of Nursing and Ancillary Healthcare (FNAH) and Faculty of Emergency and Critical Care (FEEC). FNAH provides education and training at five campuses and FECC at two campuses.

Netcare embarked on a digitisation programme in 2018, aligned to the global trend of digital enablement and rich data availability, insights and utilisation which can be leveraged to drive improvements in healthcare delivery, partnering with five global technology companies to enable delivery of the group’s strategy.

Netcare is implementing an integrated, fully mobile patient care system – CareOn - as a key part of its digitisation project.

The CareOn solution includes full digital integration of medical equipment in wards and theatres, pathology laboratories, radiology and the blood bank, with information such as patient observations feeding directly into, and being stored on, the mobile platform in real time.  This will enable a seamless interface between healthcare practitioners, eliminating the fragmentation of healthcare services as well as the duplication of diagnostic procedures. By utilising machine learning and AI, and enhancing Netcare’s data analytics capabilities, treatment protocols to improve outcomes can be better informed. CareOn will also enable patients to have electronic access to their medical records.

History
Netcare was established in 1996, and was listed on the JSE Limited (Johannesburg Stock Exchange) the same year. It initially expanded into the UK in 2001. In 2002 it won The Ophthalmic Chain contract
in Kent, Merseyside, Cumbria, Lancashire, Hampshire, and Thames Valley, to carry out 44,500 cataract removals over a 5-year period and the £2.5bn contract for the  Greater Manchester Surgical Centre, a 48-bed facility at Trafford General Hospital to provide 44,863 elective procedures over 5 years with a diagnostics programme valued at £1bn.  In 2004 it signed a contract to carry out 41,600 cataract operations for the NHS at sites throughout the UK including Cumberland Infirmary.

The company acquired a controlling stake in General Healthcare Group, the UK's largest private hospital group with 50 hospitals, in 2006 for £2.2 billion. This brought Netcare's total number of hospitals to 120 with over 11,000 beds, 510 operating theatres, and 37 pharmacies. GHG had a subsidiary company, Amicus Health which tendered for NHS contracts.  It had contracts with Stracathro Hospital for 8000 episodes of elective surgery in orthopaedics, urology, general surgery and gastroenterology from 2006–9. The company used Vanguard Healthcare mobile units to treat NHS cataract patients across the UK.  The mobile cataract units in Cumbria had failure rates 6 times that of local NHS facilities.

In 2019, Netcare partnered with Founders Factory Africa, selecting 35 African health-tech startups for an acceleration and incubation program. Accelerated startups will receive a £30,000 cash investment (≈$38,000) and £220,000 in support services from Founders Factory Africa. Incubator health-tech ventures will receive £60K cash and £100K toward support. Founders Factory Africa and Netcare will share a 5 to 10 percent equity stake in each startup accepted into the program.

Capybara:

References

Companies established in 1996
Health care companies of South Africa
Health care companies of the United Kingdom
Health care companies established in 1996
Companies based in Sandton
Private providers of NHS services
Companies listed on the Johannesburg Stock Exchange